Francis Gilmore (12 September 1909 – 26 April 1955) was an Australian cricketer and rugby league footballer. He played two first-class cricket matches for New South Wales between 1938/39 and 1939/40, before which he competed as a first-grade rugby league player for Newtown and Balmain.

Gilmore made his first grade rugby league debut in Round 3 1931 against Balmain at Marrickville Oval.  Gilmore initially started as a five-eighth at Newtown before switching to the centres for the 1933 season.

In 1933, Gilmore played for Newtown in the 1933 NSWRL grand final against St George at the Sydney Sports Ground.  Newtown would win the match 18-5 claiming its second premiership with Gilmore kicking 3 goals.

Gilmore played with Newtown up until the end of 1935 before departing the club.  Due to the residency rules at the time, Gilmore sat out the 1936 season before signing with Balmain in 1937.  Gilmore played only a single game for Balmain before retiring at the end of 1937.

See also
 List of New South Wales representative cricketers

References

External links
 

1909 births
1955 deaths
Australian cricketers
New South Wales cricketers
Australian rugby league players
Newtown Jets players
Balmain Tigers players
Rugby league centres
Rugby league halfbacks
Rugby league five-eighths
Rugby league players from Yass, New South Wales